Cathartus quadricollis, the square-necked grain beetle, is a species of beetles in the family Silvanidae, the only species in the genus Cathartus.

References

Silvanidae genera
Monotypic Cucujoidea genera